The BCT Common controller (CC) serves as a controller for many different BCT (brigade combat team) unmanned systems.

The BCT CC consolidates control of numerous systems into one integrated networked controller, reducing the logistics footprint on the battlefield and empowering the soldier with enhanced intelligence, surveillance and reconnaissance capability. Being networked, the CC will also simplify training. The BCT CC controls the Class I unmanned aerial system (UAS), the Multifunctional Utility/Logistics and Equipment vehicle (MULE), the XM1216 Small Unmanned Ground Vehicle (SUGV), and urban unattended ground sensors (U-UGS). 

The BCT CC will communicate via the network in Spiral 2/3/4, will perform selected training, logistics/maintenance, medical, and other soldier functions.

As of December 2012, the US Army did not have a networked central control device for various unmanned platforms and sensors within the BCT. Still in development, the BCT CC will provide that capability and will be sent to the BCTs as it technologically matures.

References
This article incorporates work from https://web.archive.org/web/20091112141910/http://www.bctmod.army.mil/systems/common_controller/index.html, which is in the public domain as it is a work of the United States Army.

Military technology
Military vehicles of the United States